Keating House may refer to:

Jeffery and Mary Keating House, Denver, Colorado, listed on the NRHP in downtown Denver, Colorado
Clarence Keating House, Jerome, Idaho, listed on the NRHP in Jerome County, Idaho
Keating House (Centreville, Maryland), listed on the National Register of Historic Places (NRHP)